Reginald Clement Howard (born May 17, 1977) is an American football coach who is the defensive quality control coach for the Washington Commanders of the National Football League (NFL). He was formerly a cornerback who played college football at Memphis before joining the NFL as an undrafted free agent in 2000. Howard played in Super Bowl XXXVIII for Carolina Panthers and also had stints with the New Orleans Saints and Miami Dolphins. He became an assistant college football coach in 2015.

References

External links
Washington Commanders bio

1977 births
Living people
Players of American football from Charlotte, North Carolina
Memphis Tigers football players
Carolina Panthers players
Miami Dolphins players
American football cornerbacks
New Orleans Saints players
Campbell Fighting Camels football coaches
Central Arkansas Bears football coaches
Washington Commanders coaches